Wye may refer to:

Place names
Wye, Kent, a village in Kent, England
Wye College, agricultural college, part of University of London before closure in 2009
Wye School, serving the above village
Wye railway station, serving the above village
Wye Racecourse, former horse racing venue
RAF Wye, former aerodrome near the above village
Wye, Montana, a town in Missoula County, Montana, US
Wye, South Australia, a town in South Australia, Australia
Wye River (plantation), was the home of William Paca, on the Eastern Shore of Maryland
Wye River, Victoria, a coastal town in Victoria, Australia
Wye Marsh, a wetland area on the south shores of Georgian Bay in Ontario, Canada
Wye Road, Strathcona County, Alberta
Wye House, a large Southern frame plantation house in Talbot County, Maryland
Wye, a fictional province in Isaac Asimov's Foundation series

Rivers
 River Wye, the major river, flowing through both Wales and England, rising on Plynlimon to the River Severn
Wye Valley, the scenic area around the lower part of the river
Wye Valley Walk, a footpath or hiking trail in Wales and England
Wye Valley Brewery, in Herefordshire, England
 River Wye, Derbyshire, a river flowing from Axe Edge Moor, Buxton to the River Derwent
 River Wye, Buckinghamshire, a river flowing from the Chiltern Hills in Buckinghamshire to Bourne End where it meets the River Thames
 Wye River (New Zealand), a minor river in the South Island of New Zealand
 Wye River (Maryland), in Maryland, US
 Wye River (Tasmania), a river of Tasmania, Australia
 Wye River (Victoria), Australia

Other uses
 The letter Y
 Wye (rail), a term used in North American railroading equivalent to an English railway triangle
 Wye ("Y"), a fitting for piping and plumbing
 Wye River Memorandum, a series of accords between Israel and the Palestinian Authority agreed at Wye River in Maryland
A "wye" connection (from "Y") in electrical engineering, a type of three-phase power connection
 A directional T interchange (or "wye interchange" or "Y interchange") between two or more roads or highways
 Wye, a powerful sector on the capital planet of Trantor in Isaac Asimov's novel, Prelude to Foundation

See also 
 Wye station (disambiguation)
 Why (disambiguation)
 Y (disambiguation)